Maryjane is a 1968 feature film starring Fabian as a high school art teacher who is framed for drug possession.

Plot
A car driven by a driver intoxicated by marijuana plunges off a cliff, killing the driver and injuring a female passenger.

It turns out marijuana use is rife at a small town high school, led by the clique of Jordan Bates. Art teacher Phil Blake tries to persuade student Jerry Blackburn not to smoke. Jerry borrows Phil's car and Jordan leaves some marijuana in it. Phil gets arrested for possession of marijuana.

Cast
Fabian as Phil Blake
Diane McBain as Ellie Holden
Michael Margotta as Jerry Blackburn
Kevin Coughlin as Jordan Bates
Patty McCormack as Susan Hoffman

Production
According to Maury Dexter "there was nothing salacious or offensive about" the film "but it did have some provocative scenes that showed the results of overindulging and the risks taken when someone needs 'a fix.'"

The movie was shot almost entirely in the Hollywood area. The Doheny Mansion in Beverly Hills was used for some scenes. "The stark beauty of the estate set against the ramblings of a young 'user' was, I thought, quite effective," wrote Dexter later.

Some scenes, including the shoplifting event, were shot in the Conejo Valley and the Decker Canyon Road area between Thousand Oaks and Malibu.

Fabian later described the film as being about "a Good Humor Man who sold marijuana to high school kids."

Reception
Dexter says "the film did very well at the box office, although, it was far from a big hit."

Diabolique magazine later wrote that:
It’s bewildering to think that AIP made this the year after The Trip (1967)… but then Sam Arkoff and Jim Nicholson were concerned about the former movie being too pro-drug so maybe they churned this out to cover their bases. Maury Dexter’s handling is generally quite lively and there is some decent enough acting, but this is just silly, with gangs of kids puffing weed and driving off cliffs, like in Reefer Madness (1936). It’s a little odd seeing Fabian play a teacher... it’s a shame this wasn’t made a few years earlier when he could have played the charismatic bad student.

References

External links

Maryjane at TCMDB

1968 films
American films about cannabis
1968 drama films
American drama films
1960s English-language films
Films directed by Maury Dexter
1960s American films